The Castle of Mey (also known for a time as Barrogill Castle) is located in Caithness, on the north coast of Scotland, about  west of John o' Groats. In fine weather there are views from the castle north to the Orkney Islands.

History
The lands of Mey belonged to the Bishops of Caithness. The Castle of Mey was built between 1566 and 1572, possibly on the site of an earlier fortification, by the 4th Earl of Caithness. According to a February 2019 report: "The castle was probably built between 1566 and 1572 by George Sinclair, 4th Earl of Caithness [and] includes a dominating tower with a series of tall ranges to the side and rear creating a three-sided courtyard open to the north and the sea."Originally a Z-plan tower house of three storeys, it had a projecting wing at the south-east, and a square tower at the north-west. The castle passed to Lord Caithness's younger son William, founder of the Sinclairs of Mey, although it later became the seat of the Earls. The castle's name was changed to Barrogill, and the structure was extended several times, in the 17th and 18th centuries, and again in 1821 when Tudor Gothic style alterations were made, to designs by William Burn. Barrogill passed out of the Sinclair family in 1889, on the death of the 15th Earl, when it passed to F. G. Heathcote (Sinclair). In 1929 it was purchased by Captain Frederic Bouhier Imbert-Terry.

The castle was used as an officers' rest home during the Second World War, and in 1950 the estate farms were sold off. By that time, only the tower was inhabitable.

Royal residence

Barrogill Castle was in a semi-derelict state when, in 1952, the estate was purchased by Queen Elizabeth The Queen Mother, the widow of George VI, who had died earlier that year.

The Queen Mother set about restoring the castle for use as a holiday home, removing some of the 19th-century additions, and reinstated the castle's original name. As part of the restoration, the castle was for the first time supplied with electricity and water.

Other work done in 1953–1954 included making the castle weathertight and habitable, as well as painting and plastering. The castle interior was also refurbished over the next few years. The west wing restoration was not completed until 1960.

The Queen Mother hung several portraits of the previous owners, the Earls of Caithness, around the castle. She regularly visited it in August and October from 1955 until her death in March 2002; the last visit was in October 2001.

In July 1996, the Queen Mother made the property, the policies and the farm over to the Queen Elizabeth Castle of Mey Trust, which has opened the castle and garden to the public regularly since her death. It is now open seven days a week from 1 May until 30 September each year, with a closed period of ten days at the end of July and the beginning of August, when King Charles III and Camilla, Queen Consort, usually stay at Mey. The Trust opened a new Visitor Centre in early 2007, and the visitor numbers for that year topped 29,000.

The Castle of Mey Trust
The Castle of Mey Trust was established by a Deed of Trust executed on 11 June 1996. Its president was the then Prince of Wales. The Trust would manage the property; its mandate was "to secure the future of the building, advance historical and architectural education, to develop the native breeds of Aberdeen Angus and Cheviot sheep and to undertake projects for the benefit of the local community", according to one report. After 2002, the Trust opened the castle for five months each summer to generate revenue that would sustain the property. In 2018, nearly 30,000 visits were recorded.

As of March 2014, the Trustees included Ashe Windham (chairman), the 20th Earl of Caithness, the 3rd Viscount Thurso, and Sir Ian Grant. There are also a number of Honorary Patrons associated with the trust: Lady Elizabeth Anson, Ken Bruce, Susan Hampshire, Kirsty King, Khalid bin Mahfouz, and Alan Titchmarsh (who is noted as being the first Honorary Patron). The trust together with the Friends and Patrons helped to maintain and promote the castle and all fundraising events.

Maintenance work completed by the Trust in 2018, including roof repairs, rewiring of the interior and lime harling of the exterior.

New stewardship
On 1 January 2019, stewardship of the Trust passed to The Prince's Foundation. The president of the Foundation is Charles III. Since 1 January 2019, he has been not only the president of the Castle of Mey Trust but also its sole Trustee, through the Foundation. The Foundation stated its intention to retain the Trust's goals: "...the preservation of buildings and monuments; the promotion of historical and architectural education; the preservation of the Aberdeen Angus breed of cattle, and the championing of wider benefits to the community, while the Duke of Rothesay and The Prince's Foundation is certain to make the continuation of his grandmother’s legacy a priority."

The Granary Lodge Bed & Breakfast
In early May 2019, the Prince of Wales (now Charles III) formally opened a new building, Granary Lodge, as a 10-bedroom bed and breakfast on the castle grounds. This building combined the previous stables and granary. During the planning stages, it was decided to have "eco-heating" and to use local materials and craftsmen where possible.

Granary Lodge is one of the first ventures under the stewardship of The Prince's Foundation. The business is owned and operated by the Trust and planned to accept guests starting on 15 May 2019. Profits will go to maintaining and operating the estate as a tourist destination.

Public use
In January 2023, it was reported that the castle would be open to the public as a part of an initiative by the Prince's Foundation to tackle loneliness and isolation in cold weather by providing warm spaces.

In popular culture
The ruins of Barrogill Castle are the scene of a black mass in the Nick Carter novel Spy Castle (1966)

The Queen Mother's purchase of the castle is featured in the Netflix show The Crown (episode 8 of the first series).

References

Further reading
 McCann, N. (2008), The Castle and Gardens of Mey, The Queen Elizabeth Castle of Mey Trust, .

External links

The Castle and Gardens of Mey

Buildings and structures completed in 1572
Buildings and structures in Caithness
Castles in Highland (council area)
Category A listed buildings in Highland (council area)
Inventory of Gardens and Designed Landscapes
Listed castles in Scotland
Royal residences in Scotland
Gardens in Highland (council area)
Historic house museums in Highland (council area)
Country houses in Highland (council area)
Reportedly haunted locations in Scotland
1572 establishments in Scotland
Tower houses in Scotland